Puerto Siles is a town in the Mamoré Province in the Beni Department of northern Bolivia. It is the capital of the Puerto Siles Municipality.

It is located around a lake.

References

External links
Satellite map at Maplandia.com

Populated places in Beni Department